Box-Office Bunny is a 1991 Looney Tunes short film directed by Darrell Van Citters and starring Bugs Bunny, Daffy Duck and Elmer Fudd. It was shown in theaters alongside The NeverEnding Story II: The Next Chapter, as well as on the subsequent home media releases for the film. It is Warner Bros.'s first Bugs Bunny theatrical release since 1964's False Hare. It was issued to commemorate Bugs' 50th anniversary and is included as a special feature on the DVD for The Looney, Looney, Looney Bugs Bunny Movie. The short marks the debut of Jeff Bergman as the voice of Bugs, Daffy, and Elmer, following the death of Mel Blanc on July 10, 1989.

Background 
In the late 1980s, Warner Bros. Animation started producing new theatrical animated shorts, featuring the Looney Tunes characters. The Duxorcist (1987) and The Night of the Living Duck (1988) were well-received individually. Both were then incorporated in the compilation film Daffy Duck's Quackbusters (1988). They marked a return to prominence for fictional character Daffy Duck. They were followed by Box-Office Bunny, the first theatrical short featuring Bugs Bunny since 1964.

According to director Darrell Van Citters, the Warner Bros. studio was uncertain what to do with the film. It was reportedly completed six to nine months before its actual release. Its release was delayed because the studio wanted to release it alongside one of their feature films, but could not decide which could best serve to spotlight it. It was finally released alongside The NeverEnding Story II: The Next Chapter (1991). The underperformance of the feature film at the box office is thought to have negatively affected the fate of the short.

Kevin Sandler believes the short set an unfortunate pattern for subsequent releases. Later Looney Tunes shorts were similarly attached to children's films which under-performed, in each case dragging the short film with them to relative obscurity. He offers the examples of Chariots of Fur and Richie Rich (1994), Carrotblanca and The Amazing Panda Adventure (1995), Superior Duck to Carpool (1996), and Pullet Surprise to Cats Don't Dance (1997). Staffers involved in the production of several of these shorts reportedly suspected that the studio already knew that these feature films were "hard-to-market". From a marketing perspective, the shorts could then be used to attract additional viewers to the cinema. Sandler himself, however, suspected that Warner Bros. was simply not particularly interested in generating publicity for the animated shorts.

Plot 
The action takes place in a massive movie theater, called "Cineminium". It is a 100-screen multiplex, constructed right above Bugs's rabbit hole. When Bugs surfaces within the theater, usher Elmer Fudd attempts to drive him away because Bugs did not purchase a ticket. Meanwhile, Daffy finds the admission fee of the multiplex to be too high for his tastes. He instead uses his library card to force open a door and sneak inside.

The would-be free rider stumbles on the usher, Elmer. To divert attention from his own illegal entry, Daffy drives Elmer to further focus on Bugs. He also joins forces with him against Bugs. Following a chase through the movie theater, Bugs manages to trap his opponents within a projection screen and within the film depicted on it. It’s apparently part of the slasher film subgenre and the trapped duo are confronted by a "hockey-mask wearing, chainsaw-wielding maniac". This scares Daffy and Elmer as they try to escape. Bugs ends the cartoon by saying, "It takes a miracle to get into pictures, and now these two jokers wanna get out."

During the Drum ending, Daffy and Elmer break through the Drum in their attempt to escape the movie, and Bugs pokes out of the hole that they made and simply says to the audience "and that's all, folks!".

Cast 
 Jeff Bergman as Bugs Bunny, Daffy Duck and Elmer Fudd
 Jim Cummings as Actor in movie
 Tress MacNeille as Actress in movie

Reception 
In his review of the film, Charles Solomon praised the film as "funny, fast-paced, brightly colored" and managing to capture the essence of the Bugs-Elmer-Daffy films by Chuck Jones without directly copying them. He found fault, however, with the concept of ending the film "at just over five minutes". In the result, all the action and gags have to be contained in too short a space. There is no real resolution.

Sources

References

External links

 

1991 films
1991 short films
1991 comedy films
1991 animated films
1990s American animated films
1990s animated short films
1990s English-language films
1990s Warner Bros. animated short films
Looney Tunes shorts
Bugs Bunny films
Daffy Duck films
Elmer Fudd films
Films set in a movie theatre
Films directed by Darrell Van Citters
Films scored by Hummie Mann
Warner Bros. Animation animated short films